Vladimir Ivanchikhin (born 1 November 1968) is a retired football player who represented Tajikistan.

Career statistics

International

Statistics accurate as of 10 September 2015.

Honours
Pamir Dushanbe
Tajik League: 1995

References

External links
 

1968 births
Living people
Tajikistani footballers
CSKA Pamir Dushanbe players
FC Kairat players
Tajikistan international footballers
Tajikistani expatriate footballers
Association football goalkeepers